Orange flag may refer to:

 Symbolic flag of the Maratha Empire
 One of the main symbols of Christian democracy political ideology 
 Flag of the Orange Order
 Flag of the Orange Free State